Justice Dambarudhar Pathak  (born 1 March 1924) was an Indian Judge and former Chief Justice of the Odisha High Court and Gauhati High Court.

Career 
Pathak was born on 1 March 1924. He obtained B.A. degree from the Calcutta University in 1946 and LL.B. degree from the Gauhati University in 1953. In order to prosecute further studies in law, he went to United Kingdom. From London University, he obtained LL.M. degree in 1957. Prior to obtaining the post graduate degree, he became Bar at law from Lincoln’s Inn in 1956 and on completion of the advanced studies, he returned to India. He was enrolled as an Advocate in the Gauhati High Court in April 1958. From 1961, he also started to conduct cases before the Supreme Court of India.

Pathak was a part-time Law Lecturer of the Law College of Gauhati University since 1958 and became the part time Principal of the said college for 3 years before his elevation to the Gauhati High Court Bench. He has contributed immensely to the legal literature by writing articles and books. He was elevated to the Bench of Gauhati High Court on 8.8.1973, the Chief Justice of Gauhati High Court from 18.4.1983 - 10.8.1983 and Chief Justice of Orissa High Court August 11, 1983 to February 28, 1986.

References

1924 births
Possibly living people